Scroll Lock (⤓ or ⇳) is a lock key (typically with an associated status light) on most IBM-compatible computer keyboards.

Depending on the operating system, it may be used for different purposes, and applications may assign functions to the key or change their behavior depending on its toggling state.

The key is not frequently used, and therefore some reduced or specialized keyboards lack  altogether.

Pressing  performs the same function as pressing . This behavior is a remnant of the original IBM PC keyboards, which did not have a dedicated  key.

Function

Window scrolling
The  key was meant to lock all scrolling techniques, and is a vestige of the original IBM PC keyboard. In the original design,  was intended to modify the behavior of the arrow keys. When the  mode was on, the arrow keys would scroll the contents of a text window instead of moving the cursor. In this usage,  is a toggling lock key like Num Lock or Caps Lock, which have a state that persists after the key is released.

Modern programs honoring this behavior include IBM Lotus Notes, Forté Agent, Image-Line FL Studio, Renoise, Microsoft Excel, Microsoft Project, LibreOffice Calc, and occasionally Microsoft Word.

Some text editors (such as Notepad++, Microsoft Visual Studio) exhibit similar behavior when the arrow keys are used with  pressed.

Most GUI environments neglect , which means scrolling must be accomplished with a mouse, using means such as scrollbars or scroll wheels. Often, the middle of the wheel mouse button works as a toggle determining if mouse movements will move the mouse cursor or scroll the contents in the scroll window.

While the window scrolling behavior with Caret navigation disabled (the default) is similar to that suggested for Scroll Lock, enabling Caret navigation will enable a cursor scrolling behavior as if Scroll Lock were disabled.

Console scrolling
Pressing the  key in the Linux console while the text is scrolling through the screen freezes the console output (but not input) during which no further text is sent to the screen, while the program continues running as usual. When  is pressed again, the screen is unfrozen and all text generated during the freeze is displayed at once. This allows the user to pause the display and read long messages that scroll through the screen too quickly to read, such as when the system is booting up (provided the keyboard driver has already been loaded). If not configured otherwise,  and  can be used instead of Scroll Lock in any terminal in Linux to freeze and unfreeze the terminal output respectively.

This behavior emulates the Hold Screen key or similar flow control mechanisms on computer terminals.

The behavior must be distinguished from pressing the Pause key during POST or under DOS, which, by default, has the effect of temporarily halting the running process.

Pressing Scroll Lock again disables this mode and moves back to the bottom of the output.

Boot diagnostics
In Multiuser DOS, System Manager, and REAL/32, activating  during boot will always enter a special diagnostic mode, where the operating system and loaded device drivers will display detailed status and debugging information about themselves and their interaction with the operating system, sometimes up to several screenfulls per loaded driver. Automatic scrolling is suspended for as long as  remains activated.

DR-DOS 7.02 and higher provides a CONFIG.SYS directive named SCROLLOCK=ON|OFF to change the Scroll Lock status on the fly.
Activating  during boot will enter a DIAG mode as well, wherein some special drivers may display more verbose messages, but in contrast to the situation under the Multiuser DOS family normal DOS drivers do not typically display additional information.

Debugging
In the Microsoft Windows NT family starting with Windows 2000, a debugging feature can be enabled, that allows the user to manually crash the system, generating a memory dump for analysis of the current state of the operating system. This can be accomplished by setting the REG_DWORD registry key HKEY_LOCAL_MACHINE\SYSTEM\CurrentControlSet\Services\i8042prt\Parameters\CrashOnCtrlScroll to 1. Once set, the user can hold the  key and tap the  key twice to trigger a Blue Screen of Death.

In Microsoft Visual Basic 5.0 and 6.0,  pauses the running program in the integrated development environment, as does its alias .

Copy and paste
In conjunction with the alternative DOS keyboard and console drivers FreeKEYB and K3PLUS,  also served as part of a copy & paste facility between applications. Compared to the standard keyboard driver KEYB these drivers offered several extensions including an extended keystroke buffer with key stacking facility, macro recorder, and a second cursor called CopyCursor, which could be invoked on demand (by default on pressing  or the middle mouse button) and freely moved on the screen using the cursor keys or the mouse, even outside the area reachable by the standard cursor in the running application. Once invoked, pressing  (or the left mouse button) the characters under the CopyCursor could be stuffed, one after another, into the keyboard buffer, from where they would be read by the running application as emulated key (or Alt Numpad) input, thereby typically showing up at the location of the standard cursor. The CopyCursor would move to the next screen position after each  (or backwards with each ). Normal keyboard input was still possible while the CopyCursor was enabled, and the user could switch between the two cursors by toggling the  hotkey again. Pressing  or  would exit the CopyCursor, so that, on its next invocation, it would show up at the position of the standard cursor again rather than at its previous location. If the screen contents were scrolled, the position of the CopyCursor would move accordingly until reaching the display limits. With  activated, keypresses would still reach the normal keystroke buffer, while CopyCursor input would be stacked up internally for later use in a second queue, dynamically maintained within the extended keystroke buffer. It was also possible to use this as input into the macro recorder for later use as scrap macro. Since this was an integral part of these keyboard drivers, it was fully transparent to running software and therefore worked with virtually any DOS programs, including at the command prompt, temporary shelled programs, and task switchers.

Other uses
IBM PC documentation called  an "inactive key". When PC Magazine asked an executive of keyboard manufacturer Key Tronic about the key's purpose in a 1983 interview, he replied "I don't know, but we put it on ours, too".

The indicator light is sometimes used for other purposes such as a keyboard layout indicator in some Linux distributions or other applications, because doing so is less likely to cause problems than manipulating other keys/lights.

Keyboard, video, mouse switches (KVM) often use the Scroll Lock key on the keyboard connected to the KVM switch for selecting between computers. On KVM switches with On-screen display (OSD), a "double click" of the Scroll Lock key often brings up the OSD, allowing the user to select the desired computer from a list or access the configuration menu of the KVM. Some models, especially those which lack an OSD, switch to the input corresponding to the number key pressed after Scroll Lock, or in the case of some 2-port switches, the up and down arrow keys. Simple models with only two or four inputs may immediately switch to the next input following a double press of the Scroll Lock key.

Scroll Lock on keyboards without a Scroll Lock key

Some laptops and keyboards do not have a physical  key. Some of these have a second function on another key that acts as if a  key was pressed. Some common methods are:
  on certain HP laptops.

Another way to press the  key is to use an on-screen keyboard. In Windows 8 and later versions, it can be found in the "Windows Ease of Access" program group. This will provide access to an emulation of a standard 101/102-key keyboard.

See also
 Arrow keys
 Break key
 Scroll wheel
 Sys Rq

References

External links
 Straightdope article about the Scroll Lock key

User interface techniques
Lock keys
IBM PC compatibles